This aims to be a complete list of optical disc manufacturers, including pre-recorded/pressed/replicated, record-able/write-once and re-writable discs.
This list is not necessarily complete or up to date - if you see a manufacturer that should be here but is not (or one that should not be here but is), please update the page accordingly. This list only lists manufacturers - not brands. For example, many Maxell DVDs are made by Ritek or CMC magnetics. Many companies use equipment from Singulus Technologies. This list includes both CD, DVD and Blu-ray recordable and rewritable media manufacturers (like Ritek), and disc replicators (companies that replicate discs with pre-recorded content, like Sony DADC).



A
 Anwell Technologies (Defunct in 2019)
Arvato Entertainment

B
 BeAll 
 Bluray Korea

C
 CD Video Manufacturing Inc.
CDA, Inc
 Cinram (went bankrupt due to shrinking demand, purchased by Technicolor SA)
 CMC Magnetics

D
 Daxon Technology
 Discovery Systems (Defunct)

E
 EMI (sold to Cinram)

F
 Fujifilm
 FAS Development Corp.

G
 Gigastorage Corporation

H
 Hitachi Maxell (Maxell, stopped)

I
 Imation (stopped)
 Infodisc (stopped)
 Infosmart Technologies

L
 Lead Data Inc.

M
Memory-Tech 
Micro-works Technology (defunct)
Mitsui Chemicals (MAM-A)
 Moser Baer (Defunct due to bankruptcy; Its assets have been liquidated)
 Mitsubishi Kagaku Media/Mitsubishi Chemical Corporation / Verbatim (sold in 2019 to CMC Magnetics)

N
 New Cyberian

O
 Optodisc Ltd.

P
 Pandisk Technologies
Philips
 Plasmon Data Systems (Defunct in late 1990's)
 Prodisc
 Pressing-Media www.pressing-media.com
 PrimeDisc 
 Princo Corp (seems to have stopped, as of 2020 they no longer appear on their home page)
Panasonic (Matsushita) (last made DVD-RAM, stopped due to shrinking demand, still makes Blu-rays)  Ending production of blu-ray discs for recording in Feb 2023

R
 Ricoh
 Ritek
 River Pro Audio

S
 SKC
 Sky Media Manufacturing SA
 Sony
 Sony DADC

T

 JVC / Taiyo Yuden (stopped due to shrinking demand, assets sold to CMC magnetics)
 TDK Corporation (former)
 Technicolor SA
 Traxdata

U
 Umedisc Group

W
 WEA Manufacturing (sold to Cinram)

V
 Verbatim

References

See also
 Blu-ray Disc authoring
 Blu-ray Disc
 Blu-ray Disc Association
 Blu-ray Disc recordable
 Blu-ray Region Code
 CBHD Based on HD DVD format.
 Comparison of high definition optical disc formats
 Digital rights management
 HD DVD
 HD NVD
 High definition optical disc format war
 Optical disc
 PlayStation 3

Blu-ray Disc
DVD
Optical disc
Recordable

Computing-related lists
Technology-related lists
Optical computer storage media